Neo was a nightclub located at 2350 N. Clark St. in the Chicago neighborhood of Lincoln Park. Established on July 25, 1979 Neo was the oldest or one of the oldest running nightclubs in Chicago and was a hangout and venue for a variety of musicians and artists, including David Bowie, Iggy Pop, David Byrne, the Clash, Siouxsie and the Banshees, and U2. The nightclub has been noted for being gay-friendly as well as part of goth subculture. Sources differ as to whether or not the character Neo from the Matrix franchise drew inspiration from the nightclub and its patrons.

History
In the 1980s the club was a center for Chicago's Punk and New Wave scenes. In 1988, on the advice of one of the bartenders employed by Neo's management, the bar was renovated to look like lower Wacker.

In 2009, Neo celebrated its 30th anniversary and was Chicago's oldest nightclub.

In 2015, the nightclub lost its lease and had to move to a new location. Since 2017, the club is currently located inside the Debonair Social Club at 1575 N Milwaukee Avenue at Chicago.

References

Nightclubs in Chicago
Music venues in Chicago
Punk rock venues
New wave music
Underground culture